Kim Wan-gi (born 8 July 1968) is a South Korean long-distance runner. He competed in the men's marathon at the 1992 Summer Olympics and the 1996 Summer Olympics.

References

External links
 

1968 births
Living people
Athletes (track and field) at the 1992 Summer Olympics
Athletes (track and field) at the 1996 Summer Olympics
South Korean male long-distance runners
South Korean male marathon runners
Olympic athletes of South Korea
Sportspeople from Seoul
Universiade medalists in athletics (track and field)
Universiade silver medalists for South Korea
Olympic male marathon runners
20th-century South Korean people